Sögtrop is a locality in the municipality Schmallenberg in the district Hochsauerlandkreis in North Rhine-Westphalia, Germany.

The village has 109 inhabitant and lies in the north of the municipality of Schmallenberg at a height of around 383 m on the Kreisstraße 38. The river Rarbach flows through the village. Sögtrop borders on the villages of Kirchrarbach, Landenbeck, Mönekind and Herhagen.

Sögtrop was first mentioned in 1225 in a document. The village used to belong to the municipality of Rarbach in Amt Fredeburg until the end of 1974.

Gallery

References

External links 
 Sögtrop 

Villages in North Rhine-Westphalia
Schmallenberg